Risso's dragonet (Callionymus risso) is a species of dragonet native to the Mediterranean Sea as well as the Black Sea and rarely found off of Portugal in the Atlantic Ocean.

References 

Risso's dragonet
Fauna of Tunisia
Fish of the Adriatic Sea
Fish of Israel
Fish of the Mediterranean Sea
Fish of the Black Sea
Risso's dragonet